Lij Seifu Mikael (Amharic: ልጅ ሰይፉ ሚካኤል, Säyfu Mikāēl, also Sayfu Mikael, Seifu Michael)  was an Ethiopian noble, member of the Solomonic dynasty, belonging to the aristocratic Amhara family from Ankober Shewa. He was the grandson of Dejazmatch Mekuria Tesfaye of Menz, a prominent general and a cousin of Emperor Menelik II of Ethiopia. A public figure, educated in Paris at Sorbonne; one of the first few nobles who started paying salaries to their household servants advocating freedom of slaves and an avid supporter of Ras Tafari in his bid to become an emperor of Ethiopia.
He served as Ethiopia's minister to France and Germany while he lived in Europe in the 1910s, Ethiopia's Consul General to Eritrea from 1921 to 1925 and Governor of several districts till the eve of the fascist invasion of Ethiopia.

He was also one of the Ethiopian POWs during the Second Italo-Ethiopian War at Asinara. Pursuant to his written accounts, he in the beginning liked and admired Ras Tafari, the future emperor Haile Selassie, during his regency for his zeal and progressive moves but later grew to scold his rule after Ras Tafari became emperor citing partisanship, disdain towards the old officials of Menelik II and Empress Zauditu, contempt to criticisms and perceived isolation of early educated Ethiopians whom he wasn't responsible for their education; as a result, Seifu as one of the earliest educated Ethiopians who didn't owe his education to Ras Tafari, believed, the roles he played in shaping modern Ethiopian institutions, especially the foreign affairs bureau he helped organize as well as his diplomatic contributions and struggles before and during the Italo-Ethiopian war and the fascists occupation have been undermined.

Seifu expressed these opinions through his surviving poems he wrote during his imprisonment by the fascists at Asinara Island and later in his life as administrator of the Ethiopian Orthodox Tewahedo Church. In one of his diaries, he expressed his grief over the knowledge of how Lij Iyasu was treated during his years of captivation and his subsequent elimination after Emperor Haile Selassie's decision to leave the country for exile in Europe. He blamed some of the Emperor's backward advisers with the exception of Ras Kassa whom, he wrote, was too religious to decide on the life of Lij Eyasu.

Biography

Born Seife Sillasie Mikael in Ankobar, Northern Shewa, was active mainly during Empress Zewditu's reign and the earliest times of Emperor Haile Selassie. His father Ato Mikael, a prominent figure in Emperor Menelik II's court, studied in Germany and was the first Ethiopian to publish an Amharic maths book as well as a medical treatise. Seifu's mother, Ato Mikael's second wife, Shewaferash Mekuria, was the daughter of one of Menelik II's generals and a close relative Dejazmatch Mekuria Tesfaye who marched with Menelik II during the monarch's successful efforts in bringing the southern Ethiopian regions under the central imperial government, later died of "Hidar Beshita", an epidemic that claimed many lives in the months of October and November.

Dejazmatch Mekuria was one of Emperor Tewodros II's prisoners at Magdala with the young Menelik after they were captured in Shewa. Ato Mikael would later die of the same epidemic in October many years later. He was laid to rest at Debre Berhan Sillasie Church alongside Dejazmatch Mekuria Tesfaye.
W/o Shewaferash later married Ras Mesfin Silleshi's uncle Grazmatch Gizaw who was half brother of Ras Mesfin's mother and gave birth to W/o Ayelech Gizaw, Seifu's half sister. Seifu completed the traditional Ethiopian religious education both in Addis Ababa and Menz at the Gerim Gabriel Church located on his father's estate. After few years at his father's residence in Aden where he attended modern school, he left for France and graduated from Sorbonne University in Paris.

According to his renowned nephew Kebede Mikael, besides the assistance of his wealthy father, he used his personal funds to pay for his education after inheriting a large amount of money from his grandfather Dejazmatch Mekuria Tesfaye who made him the sole heir to his estate.
During his stay in Europe, he assisted Ethiopian diplomats with translations thus having exposure to foreign dignitaries. During that time, he cultivated lasting friendships with his father's friends BlattenGeta Heruy Wolde Selassie, Mersha Nahusenay, Fitawrari Tekle Hawariat Tekle Mariyam and later in Ethiopia with Hakim Workneh Eshete also known as Dr. Charles Martin who was a good friend to his father Ato Mikael whom the doctor regarded as a close friend and a go-to person to have an immediate access to Emperor Menelik with whom Hakim Workneh later enjoyed daily visits to treat the aging and ailing monarch. Ato Mikael was instrumental in arranging Hakim Workneh's marriage to W/O Qatsala Tullu. Seifu would later marry Hakim Workneh's daughter Sara Martin.

Professional life
Upon his return from Europe and his father's death, Seifu as a young man traveled with Blattengeta Heruy Wolde Selassie and other senior members of the imperial government to Europe assisting them with his foreign languages proficiency and foreign affairs advice.
In June 1919, he was among the special commissioners sent to Europe by Empress Zewditu who presented a letter of congratulations to the King and Queen of the United Kingdom for the success of the allied arms.
He served as Ethiopian Ambassador to France from 1920 to 1923.
He was then appointed as Ethiopian Consul General to Eritrea by Empress Zewditu in 1923 and lived in Asmara till the end of 1926. Generally regarded as a man close to Lij Eyasu who shared mutual positive views about the Germans , the future Emperor Haile Selassie held him with some uneasiness, later recalled him from Eritrea and made him governor of the lucrative Chercher, Baka Mehesso region in 1927 during which time he started a modern coffee farm at Mangudetu in the Baka woreda. Known for his hot tempered impatience for tardiness and poor performance at work by public servants in the rather uncivilized province compared to Asmara he served as Consul General, he came to be called "Seifu Gomoraw". In the mid 1930s, Hakim Workneh got Seifu's old job as governor of Chercher and Seifu was appointed as deputy governor upon the departure of Hakim Workneh leaving for England.

In the early 1930s, he traveled to Europe with Blattengeta Heruy to help secure arms to Ethiopia and strengthen Ethiopian position in the League of Nations securing support from Germany that supplied essential weaponry to Ethiopia. Seifu used his expertise as supplier of arms to the Ethiopian Empire to bypass colonial powers encircling Ethiopia to deliver the weapons and ammunition.
While serving as a public servant, he also led a very successful arms supply business partnering with another French educated Ethiopian, Ato Gebre Ebziabher. According to surviving documents, they bought, imported and sold weapons and ammunition worth millions of Maria Theresa Thalers, a favored currency of that time in the Ethiopian Empire. He used the proceeds to acquire expansive commercial real estate and start modern farms in the country.

In 1924, he was part of the delegation who met with the German president Mr Frederick Ebert. Ethiopia was represented by Dejazmatch Haile Sellasie Abayneh, Lij Seifu Mikael and Ato Sahle Tsedalu.
Dejazmach Haile Sellasie Abayneh who raised Emperor Haile Sellasie with his son Imru Haile Sellasie was one of the senior nobles with whom Seifu enjoyed close affinity and traveled with him to European countries. Dejazmach Abayneh had a huge and positive influence on the Emperor during his regency and many members of the monarchy and ministers used his influence to advance their opinions as well as their ambitions.
After the fascist Italian invasion during the Second Italo-Ethiopian War, Seifu accompanied the Emperor to Djibouti along with Mekonnen Habtewold, Fitawrari Tekle Hawariat Tekle Mariyam and other notables according to Fitawrari TekleHawariat's autobiography. Before leaving Addis Ababa, Seifu became one of the nobles along with Ras Kassa standing against those who decided the alleged elimination of Lij Eyasu convincing the Emperor not leave an heir to the throne for the Italians to later use. He later returned to Ethiopia from Djibouti after a fallout with the emperor due to an overheard conversation with Fitawrari TekleHawariat criticizing Haile Sellasie over the life of Lij Eyasu. He joined the resistance leading a small contingent of patriots at Awsa front which was the offshoot of the early struggle of the Black Lions created by educated Ethiopians and disbanded members of the army.

The Awsa front was in close proximity to Djibouti and joined by few returnees who decided patriotism over exile. He was captured early in the struggle by the Italians after his unit at Awsa was destroyed. He was imprisoned till the assassination attempt on Graziani and was later transferred to the Asinara island prison after the attempt. His wife Sara Workneh, her mother and her siblings were also among the 400 Ethiopian POWs during the Second Italo-Ethiopian War at Asinara He was repatriated back to Ethiopia with his wife by the end of 1939 after relentless requests by his nephew Kebede Mikael who submitted to the Italians. It was common with prominent collaborators to request the release of their relatives; Ras Seyoum Mengesha was one of the most prominent Ethiopians who submitted to the enemy but yet played a role in securing the release of many of his relatives and tens fellow Ethiopians. Upon his return, Seifu was suspected by the Italians for getting and passing crucial tactical information from his nephew Kebede Mikael and Dejazmatch Melise Sahle who was also a collaborator and father-in-law of Kebede Mikael, to the patriots in Gojam and Northern Showa.

Belay Zeleke and other patriots used the information secretly sent to them by the nobles who had ways of getting information. Due to lack of evidence, the Italians overlooked the allegations against Kebede Mikael and the fascist appointed Dejazmatch but put Seifu under house arrest at his estate till the liberation.
After the liberation, Emperor Haile Sellasie, disappointed of Seifu's opposition over the highly secret decision to eliminate Lij Iyasu before leaving for exile and the remarks he made to the Monarch in Djibouti, ordered him to stay on house arrest for a year while pardoning the known collaborators. Seifu as a result became increasingly outspoken critic of Haile Selassie and went as far as aiding Belay Zeleke with whom he had contact during the occupation, to escape from prison and furnishing him with funds to stay underground. After the capture of Belay Zeleke, Seifu was implicated and ordered to remain under house arrest indefinitely while Belay Zeleke, his brother and other fellow patriots, friends and relatives who rebelled against the emperor were hanged. As a result of his defiance, the assets he lost to Ras Hailu during the occupation was denied to him under the provisions that Ras Hailu's wealth has been confiscated and transferred to the Ministry of Treasury and part of the prime Addis Ababa property he lost to the Italians which was developed into the iconic Ras Hotel, effectively became the property of the government. His last appointment was as an administrator of the Ethiopian Orthodox Church, only to get caught up in another feud with the emperor for the comments he made during a dinner party in the presence of people close to Haile Selassie about the coup d'é·tat attempt of the 1950s by a group of young educated Ethiopians to limit the power of the monarch and start a constitutional monarchy.
According to Ambassador Ahadu Sabure, Seifu initially disagreed about the coup attempt but said if it was him who tried, he would have made a successful coup by pointing out the steps he would have taken. The emperor was told about the conversation and called the prominent businessman Ato Bekele Shebah who was present when the conversation took over. Bekele told the emperor that Seifu didn't mean it but simply commented on the situation. Seifu would later be called to the palace to explain his comments which he didn't deny making them and for the third time, he was ordered to stay under house arrest at his Ambo farm and died from complications of diabetes and high blood pressure in Addis Ababa after a while.
The person who informed to the emperor about the conversation was promoted.
The crown prince with whom he has enjoyed a lifelong friendship attended the funeral. During his tenure as administrator of the Church, from his own personal funds built the main hall at the Church headquarters behind St Mary's Church as well as houses for the use of Church fathers.

Personal life
In 1927 he married W/o Zewde Haile, the grand daughter of Aba WoldeHana Gebre, a very respected elderly monk whose father was one of Menelik's chiefs by the time he brought the Harar province under his rule and a Shewa family of extremely conservative Orthodox Christian roots. Seifu later made Aba WoldeHana the Aleka of the TekleHaimanot Church he built in Bekka, Harar. W/o Zewde gave birth to his first born Kifle Seifu on the same day the Church was inaugurated on Sep 11, 1928. They separated by the end of 1929. He named his son after his best friend Dejazmatch Kifle Dadi. During his time as governor of Cherecher, his close relationship with Aba WoldeHana influenced his devotion to the Ethiopian Church and commissioned the construction of Orthodox Churches in different parts of the Harar province including the TekleHaimanot Church at which his son Kifle Seifu was baptized. 
He married Hakim Workneh Eshete's daughter Sarah Workneh at St George Church in June 1934, her father was also at one point the governor of Chercher. He was at the Asinara Italian island prison with his wife Sara.  They were repatriated back to Ethiopia by the end of 1939. The marriage ended around the time Ethiopia gained her independence and she died shortly after. The union didn't produce any children. Seifu's father Mikael Birru whom the doctor considered a close friend was one of the people who arranged the marriage between Hakim Workneh Eshete and W/o Qatsala Tullu.
In 1951, he married Dejazmatch Hailu's daughter W/o Aster Hailu whose father was also an inmate with Seifu and his wife Sara at Asinara Italian prison.
From this union, he fathered Sirak Seifu, Hailu Seifu and Eskinder Seifu. Dejazmatch Hailu was an imposing dignitary and a direct descendant of the Tigre branch of the Solomonic Dynasty and a very close relative of Emperor Yohannes IV.

Lij Seifu Mikael was unpublished writer who wrote philosophical aspects of life, religion and politics. He wrote numerous poems.
The famous Ethiopian scholar Kebede Mikael was his nephew, the son of his older sister Woizero Atsede Mikael. Seifu brought Kebede from Menz and enrolled him at the Cathedral School and later to Lazarist Mission and Alliance Ethio-Francaise. He later requested the permission of the Emperor to have Kebede teach the young and favorite son of the Emperor, Prince Makonnen Haile Selassie. Most of Kebede's works were influenced by his uncle Seifu's writings.

In the last years of his life, he bought land at Ambo where he at two different times stayed on gizot and started the first turkey farm in the country. During those years, he enjoyed the unwavering friendship of Dejazmatch Girmachew Tekle Hawariat who, till the last day of his life stood by his side. Seifu reminded him of his own father Fitawrari Tekle Hawariat Tekle Mariyam who was a modernist, outspoken man who spoke his mind and got in trouble for it. Like Seifu, he was shunned by the Emperor who according to Fitawrari Tekle Hawariat's memoir, hated challenges from educated Ethiopians. Fitawrari Tekle Hawariat, who drafted the very first Ethiopian constitution and represented Ethiopia at the League of Nations under different capacities, has been put under house arrest at different times for reasons that were so trivial such as, for not coming out of a meeting to greet Empress Menen. According to John Spencer, outspoken critics to the Emperor's rule were demoralized by different stories told against them and suffering the Emperor's signature punishment of "Gizot" while the rest where banished to provincial posts or abroad where they couldn't challenge the emperor.

Lij Seifu and Fitawrari Tekle Hawariat were regarded as outspoken critics. The grandchildren of the influential and much respected Dejazmatch Germame of Menelik's era were perceived as independent thinkers and made to serve as ambassadors to different countries and at posts where they didn't enjoy much influence. The second most powerful person in the Ethiopian empire next to the emperor himself, Tsehafe Ta'ezaz Wolde Giyorgis Wolde Yohannes later suffered the same fate, demoted from his post to becoming the governor of Arusi.
With Ras Abebe Aregai's and Ras Mesfin Sileshi's exception who succeeded in winning the emperor's trust, most patriots as well as POWs like Seifu were largely out of favor due to a popular belief that they felt more honor and independence comparing their struggle with the emperor's five years exile in England. According to people who were closest to the monarch, the emperor was very experienced with having people owe their success to him as well as pardoning people who betrayed their country that made them loyal to his rule out of embarrassment.
The most senior member of the royalty who was captured after a long patriotic struggle he led under the banner of the "Black Lions"  he helped create was Leul Ras Imru Haile Selassie, the Emperor's cousin. He was later a POW at different Italian prison camps. Because he was a childhood friend of the emperor who saw each other as brothers, became another exception by staying close to the emperor with a very considerable influence in the empire. He was considered by many to be a man of integrity and faith, who, despite the emperor's protest, remained to be a close friend to people the emperor has distanced from the government. He was very much liked by Seifu who has always spoken highly of the senior prince, specially for his unique character of avoiding palace intrigues and gossips many nobles and officials used to destroy each other. Leul Ras Imru and his immediate family survived the Derg's despicable crimes against the members of the monarchy.

References

People from Addis Ababa
20th-century Ethiopian politicians
History of Ethiopia
1892 births
Year of death missing